Vladimir "Vlado" Georgiev (born 6 June 1976) is a Serbian singer-songwriter and producer. Georgiev remains one of the most prominent musicians in the Balkans.

Georgiev served as a judge on television series Prvi glas Srbije in 2011 and 2012, and Tvoje lice zvuči poznato in 2016.

Biography

Family and personal life
Georgiev was born in Dubrovnik to Dragoljub, (a Bulgarian from Dimitrovgrad, Serbia) and Borka (a Serb from Sarajevo, Bosnia and Herzegovina.) He has an older brother, Saša.

Shortly after his birth, his family moved to Herceg Novi in Montenegro, where he was raised and lived until age 16, after which he and his brother moved to Belgrade. One of his hobbies is riding motorcycles. He has traveled around Europe on his Harley-Davidson.

Career
Georgiev has recorded three studio albums to date: Navika (Habit) in 2001, Žena bez imena (Woman without a name) in 2003, and Daljina (Distance) in 2013. In 2005, he released a hit single, "Nisam ljubomoran" ("I'm not jealous"). After a two-year break he released a single, "Do svitanja" ("Till Dawn"), along with a ballad, "Ti i ja" ("You and I"). In 2009, he released two singles, Hej ti (Hey You), which became a huge success, along with a ballad, "Bez tebe" ("Without You").

He played accordion, then he started playing piano, synthesizers and other keyboards. He started writing songs for himself and for the other popular stars in ex-Yugoslavia. He was also a producer for the Montenegrin hip hop band Monteniggers, and is still a friend with their only living member, Niggor. Georgiev and Niggor recorded the song "Tropski bar" together. He has his own record label, Barba Music and VG-Art studio production company, Studio Barba, in Belgrade. He worked as coach in the two editions of the Serbian version of the talent-show The Voice (Prvi glas Srbije) in 2011–12.

Political views
Georgiev has also expressed his views on some political issues. He stated his support for several conspiracy theories such as QAnon, and promoted misinformation regarding COVID-19 vaccines and the pandemic. In January 2022, he compared the Australian government to Nazi Germany.

Discography

Albums
 Navika (Habit), 2001.
 Žena bez imena (Woman Without a Name), 2003.
 Daljina (Distance), 2013.

Singles
 Nisam ljubomoran (I'm Not Jealous), 2005.
 Do svitanja (Till Dawn), 2007.
 Hej ti (Hey You), 2009.
 Iskreno (Honestly), 2014. 
 Znam te najbolje (I Know You The Best), 2018.
 Tebe žedan (Thirsty Of You), 2018.

See also
 Music of Serbia
 List of singers from Serbia
 Serbian pop

References

External links
 
 Vlado Georgiev discography at Discogs

1977 births
Living people
Serbian pop singers
21st-century Serbian male singers
People from Herceg Novi
Montenegrin people of Bulgarian descent
Montenegrin people of Serbian descent
Montenegrin people of Bosnia and Herzegovina descent
Serbian people of Bosnia and Herzegovina descent
Serbian people of Bulgarian descent
Serbs of Montenegro